Fred Rayhle (born April 9, 1954 in Covington, Kentucky) is a former professional American football player who played in one NFL season in 1977 for the Seattle Seahawks.

1954 births
American football tight ends
Living people
Chattanooga Mocs football players
Sportspeople from Covington, Kentucky
Seattle Seahawks players